The 1971 President's Cup Football Tournament was the first competition of Korea Cup. The competition was held from 2 to 15 May 1971. South Korea and Burma played out a 0–0 draw and shared the trophy.

Group stage

Group A

Group B

Knockout stage

Bracket

Semi-finals

Third place play-off

Final

Replay

See also
Korea Cup
South Korea national football team results

References

External links
President Park's Cup 1971 (South Korea) at RSSSF

1971